Alden Caleb Ehrenreich (born November 22, 1989) is an American actor. He began his career by appearing in Supernatural (2005), and Francis Ford Coppola's films Tetro (2009) and Twixt (2011). Following supporting roles in the 2013 films Blue Jasmine and Stoker, he starred in the Coen brothers comedy Hail, Caesar! (2016), for which he gained praise. He went on to play Han Solo in the space Western film Solo: A Star Wars Story (2018) and starred in the dystopian television series Brave New World (2020).

Early life
Ehrenreich was born in Los Angeles, California. He is the only child of Sari (née Newmann), an interior designer, and Mark Ehrenreich, an accountant. He is named after the director Phil Alden Robinson, a family friend. His stepfather, Harry Aronowitz, is an orthodontist. Ehrenreich is Jewish; his ancestors were Jewish emigrants from Austria, Hungary, Russia, and Poland, and he was raised in Reconstructionist Judaism.

Ehrenreich began acting at the Palisades Elementary School in Pacific Palisades, Los Angeles, and continued doing so at Crossroads School in Santa Monica, California. After graduating from high school, he studied acting at New York University at the Stella Adler Studio of Acting, but never finished his degree. In 2009, he co-founded "The Collectin" with his friend Zoë Worth, a group of New York City actors, writers, producers and directors who collaborate on films and theater performances.

Career
Ehrenreich was discovered at a friend's bat mitzvah reception by Steven Spielberg, who watched a comedy video created by Ehrenreich and a friend, "which began in the present and eventually cut to 20 or 30 years later, with Mr. Ehrenreich, in a kimono, screaming to stop a wedding." Ehrenreich has described the comedic performance he gave in the movie as, "I ran around as a skinny little punk, trying on girls' clothes and eating dirt." He was then contacted by DreamWorks, a studio which Spielberg helped found, and met with its casting director. Spielberg said of Ehrenreich:
[He] was in a bat mitzvah video that my daughter acted with him in for their best friend. They showed me the video and I loved it and I got him an agent. That's sort of how it all began... I thought he had a lot of promise in comedy... I didn't know he was going to rogue [into] drama. He was so funny in this video, I thought, "I have found the next really funny comedian." But most of his choices have been in drama and people don't know how really funny he is. 
The meeting with Spielberg led to acting roles on television shows such as Supernatural and CSI: Crime Scene Investigation.

In 2007, Ehrenreich won the role of Bennie Tetrocini in Francis Ford Coppola's Tetro. Coppola asked Ehrenreich to read a passage from The Catcher in the Rye for his main audition. The film was released in limited release in 2009 and received generally positive reviews from critics, who praised Ehrenreich's performance. In 2011, he played a minor role in Coppola's subsequent film Twixt and appeared alongside Natalie Portman in the Sofia Coppola-directed Miss Dior Cherie commercial.

In 2013, he starred as Ethan Wate in the film adaptation of the novel Beautiful Creatures, and appeared as Whip Taylor in Park Chan-wook's thriller film Stoker. He then played the stepson of Cate Blanchett in the Woody Allen-directed drama film Blue Jasmine. In 2016, Ehrenreich became more widely known for his co-leading role as Hobie Doyle in the Coen brothers film Hail, Caesar!, alongside a cast that included Josh Brolin and George Clooney. Many critics praised Ehrenreich's performance in particular. That same year, Ehrenreich starred in the leading role of Frank Forbes in Warren Beatty's romantic comedy-drama Rules Don't Apply. He then starred in The Yellow Birds with Tye Sheridan, Jack Huston, and Jennifer Aniston, which premiered at the 2017 Sundance Film Festival.

Ehrenreich starred as Han Solo in the Star Wars anthology film Solo: A Star Wars Story (2018), following Solo's early life before the events of the original 1977 Star Wars. He headlined the Brave New World series on NBC, based on the 1932 novel of the same name by Aldous Huxley. 

Ehrenreich's upcoming projects include the thriller Fair Play co-starring Phoebe Dynevor, Cocaine Bear, directed by Elizabeth Banks, Oppenheimer, directed by Christopher Nolan, and will have a role in the Marvel Cinematic Universe miniseries Ironheart.

Filmography

Film

Television

Video games

References

External links

1989 births
21st-century American male actors
American male child actors
American male film actors
American male television actors
American people of Austrian-Jewish descent
American people of Hungarian-Jewish descent
American people of Polish-Jewish descent
American people of Russian-Jewish descent
Crossroads School alumni
Jewish American male actors
Living people
Male actors from Los Angeles
Stella Adler Studio of Acting alumni
Tisch School of the Arts alumni
American Reconstructionist Jews